Patriarch Meletius II Doumani (1839 – 1906) was Greek Orthodox Patriarch of Antioch (1899–1906). He was the first Arab and the first Syrian primate of non-Greek descent in 168 years.

When Saint Raphael (then an archimandrite) was elected Bishop of Zahleh, Lebanon in December 1901, Meletius asked him to return to the patriarchate from his mission in the United States. Archimandrite Raphael politely refused, noting that he wished to complete the work he was then doing in the United States.

Literature
 Mufarrij, Rafeek, «The patriarchal crisis in the See of Antioch and the election of Melatios Doumani: causes, main events and results, 1891—1899» (2000)
 Якушев М. И. Первый Патриарх-араб на Антиохийском престоле // Восточный архив, 2006. — № 14-15. — С. 99-106

External links
 Primates of the Apostolic See of Antioch

1839 births
1906 deaths
Greek Orthodox Patriarchs of Antioch
Syrian Christian clergy